The 2016 American Athletic Conference football season was the 25th NCAA Division I FBS football season of the American Athletic Conference (The American). The season was the third since the breakup of the former Big East Conference, and the third season with the College Football Playoff in place. The American was considered a member of the "Group of Five" (G5) with Conference USA, the Mid-American Conference, Mountain West Conference, and the Sun Belt Conference. Whereas under the previous system the champion of the conference was guaranteed an automatic berth to a BCS bowl game, the highest-ranked champion member of the G5 received a bid to one of the six major bowls.

The American consisted of 12 members: Cincinnati, East Carolina,  Houston, Memphis, SMU, South Florida, Temple, Tulane, Tulsa, UCF, UConn, Navy. In June 2015, the Collegiate Commissioner's Association announced that it would postpone final rankings until after the annual Army–Navy Game if Navy or Army are in contention for a spot in the semifinals or a New Years Six bowl. If Navy was the highest-ranked Group of 5 champion and loses to Army, it would be replaced by next highest-ranked Group of 5 champion in the New Years Six Bowl.

In the 2016 season, the American had four new coaches. Willie Fritz, formerly the head coach at Georgia Southern, was hired by Tulane to replace Curtis Johnson. After beginning the 2013 season, Johnson lost 22 of his final 27 games against FBS opponents. He finished at Tulane with a 15–4 record through four full seasons. He compiled a 7–9 conference record in the C-USA (2012–2013), and a 3–13 conference record in the American Athletic Conference (2014–2015).  On December 1, 2015, UCF hired Oregon offensive coordinator Scott Frost. Frost replaced longtime UCF head coach George O'Leary and interim head coach Danny Barrett, who took over the Knights when O'Leary resigned following an 0–8 start. On December 3, 2015,  Memphis hired Arizona State offensive coordinator and quarterbacks coach Mike Norvell, replacing Justin Fuente who took the job at Virginia Tech.  On December 13, 2015 East Carolina hired Duke (/) Scottie Montgomery. replacing Ruffin McNeill who was relieved of his duties as ECU head coach after finishing the season with a record of 5–7.

American Athletic Conference Media Day
The American Athletic Conference Media Day took place August 12 in Newport, Rhode Island.

Preseason poll

East Division
1. USF (15), 164 pts
2. Temple (9), 144 pts
3. Cincinnati (6), 130 pts
4. UConn, 89 pts
5. East Carolina, 55 pts
6. UCF, 48 pts

	
West Division
1. Houston (30), 180 pts
2. Navy, 128 pts
3. Memphis, 124 pts
4. Tulsa, 92 pts
5. SMU, 65 pts
6. Tulane, 41 pts

 Predicted American Championship Game Winner: Houston (27) was picked to win the American Championship.  Others receiving votes were USF (2), Temple (1)

Head coaches

East
 Tommy Tuberville, Cincinnati – 4th year
 Bob Diaco, Connecticut – 3rd year
 Scottie Montgomery, East Carolina – 1st year
 Willie Taggart, South Florida – 4th year
 Matt Rhule, Temple – 4th year
 Scott Frost, UCF – 1st year

West
 Tom Herman, Houston – 2nd year
 Mike Norvell, Memphis – 1st year
 Ken Niumatalolo, Navy – 9th year
 Chad Morris, SMU – 2nd year
 Willie Fritz, Tulane – 1st year
 Philip Montgomery, Tulsa – 2nd year

Recruiting classes

Rankings

Schedule
All Times and Dates are Tentative, The 2016 conference football schedule was released February 9

Week 1

Week 2

Week 3

Week 4

Week 5

Week 6

The October 7th game in Orlando between Tulane and UCF was postponed due to Hurricane Matthew and rescheduled for November 5, a date which both teams had open.

Week 7

The October 13th game in Greenville, NC between Navy and East Carolina was postponed due because of flooding associated with Hurricane Matthew, the game will be rescheduled for November 19, a date which both teams had open.

Week 8

Week 9

Week 10

Week 11

Week 12

Week 13

American Athletic Conference Championship Game

Week 15

Bowl games
American Athletic Conference bowl games for the 2016 season are:

Rankings are from CFP Poll.  All times Eastern Time Zone.

Selection of teams
Bowl eligible:  Houston, Memphis, Navy, South Florida, Temple, Tulsa, UCF
Bowl-ineligible: Cincinnati, Connecticut, East Carolina, Tulane, SMU

Records against FBS conferences
2016 records against FBS conferences

Through Dec 29, 2016

The American vs. Power Conferences

‡This game was played at a neutral site

Players of the Week

Awards and honors

Conference awards
The following individuals received postseason honors as voted by the American Athletic Conference football coaches at the end of the season

NFL Draft

The American had a conference-record 15 players selected in the 2017 NFL draft, which placed it as the fifth most prolific conference in the draft. The American made headlines by having more selections than the Big 12 Conference, a Power 5 Conference.
The following list includes all AAC players who were drafted in the 2017 NFL draft.

Attendance

Games highlighted in green were sell-outs
†Season High

Attendance for neutral site games
 September 3 – Houston vs. Oklahoma, NRG Stadium: 71,016
 November 5 – Navy vs. Notre Dame, EverBank Field: 50,867
 December 10 – Navy vs. Army, M&T Bank Stadium: 71,600

References